Kestilä is a village and former municipality of Finland. It is located in the province of Oulu and is part of the Northern Ostrobothnia region.

Established in 1867, the population was 536 as of 31 December 2015.

The municipality was unilingually Finnish.

The municipality was consolidated with Piippola, Pulkkila and Rantsila on 2009-01-01 to form a new municipality of Siikalatva.

References

External links 

 Municipality of Kestilä – official site

Former municipalities of Finland
Populated places established in 1867
Populated places disestablished in 2009
2009 disestablishments in Finland
Siikalatva